Festus Bunmi Olusona (born 2 June 1965) is a Nigerian human rights activist and politician.

Education 
Olusona graduated with a Bachelor of Arts in Philosophy with Honours from the University of Ibadan, Nigeria in 1992.

Campus politics
Reverend Bunmi Olusona also known as 'Beyond Jordan' amongst fellow activists was a fierce Students' Union activist. He started student activism from the Kwara State College of Technology 1984/85 now renamed the Kwara State Polytechnic. He became the Vice President of the Reformers Academy: an Organisation formed by Professor Osam Edim Osam of the University of Ibadan, UI.

He contested and became the President of the University of Ibadan Students Union in 1989/90 under Professor Ayo Banjo,  the then Vice Chancellor. By 1991/92 Bunmi Olusona became Zonal D Chairman of the National Association of Nigerian Students (NANS) comprising all the tertiary institutions of south western part of Nigeria. After a popular nationwide anti-SAP riots of 1989, Bunmi Olusona and a few other students' leaders of the NANS were unlawfully arrested, detained and lumped with hardened criminals at the over-crowded Nigeria Ikoyi Prisons and Kirikiri maximum prison under decree no 2 of 1984. This notorious decree was enacted by the former Nigerian military dictator, General Ibrahim Badamosi Babangida. At the end of the uprising, over two hundred Nigerians were estimated to have been killed by the police, a huge number wounded and some student activists detained.

Bunmi Olusona was unlawfully arrested and detained alongside other students' activists namely: Christian Akanni, Kayode Olatunji, Late Barrister Bamidele Aturu, Barrister Opeyemi Bamidele,  Barrister Abdul Aminu Mahmud, Emmanuel Nwanzu and Nasir Kura. He and some of these activists were four months both at the SSS detention facility at Ikoyi, they were later moved into Ikoyi and Kirikiri maximum prisons under the Detention of Persons Decree No. 2 of 1984 as amended. It was detention without trial. He was released along with other (NANS) leaders after a legal battle sponsored by the Barrister Alao Aka  Bashorun  led Nigerian Bar Association (NBA) and Barrister Olisa Agbakoba led Civil Liberties Organisation (CLO). Bunmi Olusona lost an academic session due to his incarceration at the Ikoyi prisons.

Bunmi Olusona and other detained students' activists were all declared prisoners of conscience by the Amnesty International in 1991/92.

Bunmi Olusona was much loved by students of the University of Ibadan (UI) due to achievements he recorded while he was President of the Students Union. All achieved due to popular struggles. Amongst them was:

Bringing 'Water Treatment Plant' at the cost of 30m in 1990 after confrontation and negotiation with the Babangida military regime. This was what resolved years of agonizing water crisis of the University. It also impacted on the water consumption needs of the entire inhabitants of the University environments including Agbowo community.
Forcing the University authority to rename erstwhile 'Students Village Hall' after Chief Obafemi Awolowo through students agitation against the wish of the University authorities.
Forcing the FG to rebuild burnt section of Queen Elizabeth Hall,  extend and complete Idia and Obafemi Awolowo halls.
Consistently fought for the protection of the rights and privileges of students.
Launched and raised funds for indigent students of the University of Ibadan.
Launched students' agricultural scheme where the Students' Union owned a farm at Ajibode, a neighboring Community.
He was a leading (NANS) activist and participated in many local and national students protests. He was constantly a thorn in the flesh of the Babangida administration even after he graduated from the University. 
Campaign Officer for the Campaign for Democracy, (CD), he was a leading mobilizer against the infamous annulment of the June 12, 1993 presidential election won by late Chief MKO Abiola.

Reverend Bunmi Olusona, who holds a bachelor's degree in Philosophy is married to Elizabeth Aderonke Olusona.

Human rights activism
He was briefly at the Civil Liberties Organisation as Field Research Officer for Women Rights Project As a field research officer. At the CLO, he also did a research on the sufferings of the Nigerian Railway workers who were owed several months salaries. The title of the booklet is Dying in Agony.
Acting Head of Campaigns, Campaign for Democracy, (CD)
Co founded Oodua Youth Movement, a Yoruba self-determination platform.
Co founded Covenant Group, a Yoruba self-determination Organisation.
Co founded Oodua Peoples Congress with Dr Frederick Fasehun.
Was a National Administrative Secretary of Movement for Socio and Economic Justice, (MOSEJ)

Exile
Rev. Bunmi Olusona went on exile to Europe during the notorious Military regime of General Sani Abacha,  As a 'Campaign Officer' with the Campaign for Democracy,  (CD)  and an active member of the Committee for the Defense of Human Rights, CDHR, he participated in many protests against the Military dictatorship of late General Sani Abacha. He fled Nigeria in 1996 after he granted a radio interview critical of the regime to CNN over the gruesome assassination of late Kudirat Abiola, wife of the late popular Nigerian millionaire politician, Chief MKO Abiola.

Bunmi Olusona has had the rare privilege of close association on the field of activism with some of Nigeria's leading human rights activists. Some of which are; Barrister Femi Falana SAN, Late Beko Ransome Kuti, Chief Frederick Fasehun,  Late Baba Omojola, Late Alao Aka Bashorun, Late Gani Fawehinmi, Barrister Osagie Obayuwana, Comrade Gbenga Awosode, Comrade Wale Adebisi,  Comrade Abiodun Aremu, Comrade Wale Adeniran, Comrade Odion Akhaine, Comrade Jiti Ogunye,  Comrade Opeyemi Bamidele, Comrade Popoola Ajayi, Gbenga Toyosi Olawepo, Comrade Rotimi Obadofin, Comrade Joe Okey Odumakin, Comrade Abdul Aminu Mahmud, Comrade Wale Okuniyi and a host of others.

Partisan politics
On his return to Nigeria, he went into party politics by joining the Alliance for Democracy (AD) and became the party's Kwara State Governorship candidate in 2007. He lost the Election to the incumbent Governor of the State, Senator Bukola Saraki who is the current Nigerian Senate President.

By 2011, he contested for the Irepodun/Oke-Ero/Ekiti/Isin federal constituency seat at the Nigerian National Assembly on the political platform of the Action Congress of Nigeria (ACN) he lost the election in controversial circumstances. The election was believed to have been rigged against him.

Reverend Bunmi Olusona was a close political associate of Barrister Mohammed Dele Belgore, a Senior Advocate of Nigeria who was the 2011 Gubernatorial Candidate of the Action Congress of Nigeria, (ACN) in Kwara State.

Bunmi Olusona became a member of the Kwara State Caretaker Committee of the Action Congress of Nigeria  (ACN) and All Progressives Congress (APC) between 2013/2014.
He later became the Interim Kwara State Chairman of the All Progressives Congress,  (APC), a position the national leadership of the party later ceded to Alhaji Ishola Fulani.

Between 2014/2015, Rev. Bunmi Olusona was the State Director General of  Mohammed Dele Belgore's Governorship campaign organization popularly called Orange Revolution

He is still actively involved in party politics as a strong member of the Nigerian ruling party, the All Progressives Congress, (APC).

Rev. Bunmi Olusona is currently the Special Adviser on 'Media and Illicit Financial Flows' to the Chairman House Committee on Financial Crimes.

Relevant publications

 Nigeria, on the Eve of "change": Transition to What? - Page 33
 1991 - Full view Five others were held at Ikoyi Prison: Nasir Kura, NANS vice president for national affairs Okereke, NANS secretary general; Olatunji Kayode, clerk of NANS senate; Bunmi Olusona, student at University of Ibadan; and Christian Akanni, student ... Liberty: A Quarterly News Letter of Civil Liberties Organisation
1990 - Snippet view - More editions detention, the students had gone on a ten-day hunger strike, causing the collapse of Bunmi Olusona, Nasir Kura and Christian Akanni. All three were suffering from diarrhoea and had been vomiting blood five days prior to their collapse. In the saddle: a vice-chancellor's story - Page 119
L. Ayo Banjo - 1997 - Snippet view - More editions ... of Mr Bunmi Olusona, (alias Beyond Jordan) former president, University of Ibadan Students Union 1989/90 session. [Olusona had reportedly disappeared from the campus and was suspected to have been abducted by security agents. Democracy in Action: The South-West Experience - Page 91]
Dapo Olasebikan - 2002 - Snippet view - More editions Akangbe, Wale Balogun, Wale Olabisi (Don), Abiodnn /« remu, Femi Obayori, Bayo Ojo, Funso Mojuba, Ebun Adegoruwa, Segun Sango, Fred Adegoke, Ayodele Akele, Kayode Ogundamisi, Bunmi Olusona, Sola Otitolaye, Taiwo Otitolaye ... The African Guardian - Page 28
1991 - Snippet view - More editions Other students challenging their incarceration are Bunmi Olusona, NANS zonal co-ordinator and final year Philosophy student of the University of lbadan. Christian Aka, a graduate student in Port Harcourt and Olatunji Kay ode, a final year ... The News - Volume 28 - Page 27
2007 - Snippet view - More editions They are the incumbent governor, Dr. Bukola Saraki (PDP), Hon. Gbenga Olawepo (DPP), Senator Suleiman Makanjuola Ajadi (AC). Others are Chief Theophilus Bamigboye (AP), Alhaji Khaleel Bolaji (ANPP) and Revd. Bunmi Olusona (AD). Annual Report, Human Rights Situation in Nigeria - Page 18
1991 - Snippet view - More editions - The affected student leaders include: Mahmud Abdul-Aminu (NANS President), Chima Okereke (NANS Secretary-General), Nasser Kura (NANS Vice-President), Bunmi Olusona (former President University of Iba^in Students Union), Bamidele  ... Errands for progress - Page 12
Opeyemi Bamidele - 2003 - Snippet view ... Biodun Ogunade, Femi Obayori, Biodun Aremu, Rotimi Obadofin, Debo Adeniran, Olumide Akanmu, Bunmi Olusona, Kayode Olatunji, Christian Akani, Olumide Adeyinka, Kayode Oladele, Kayode Opeifa, Anthony Olusanya, Toyin Adeniran, ... Annual Report on Human Rights in Nigeria - Page 77
1991 - Snippet view - More editions The said meeting was attended on the side of the Students by Bamidele Opeyemi, a former NANS President; Sylvester Odion, Public Relations Officer; Chima Okereke, Secretary-General; Bunmi Olusona, then President University of Ibadan  ... Patterns of Abuse of Women's Rights in Employment and Police ...
Theresa Akumadu - 1995 - Snippet view - They include Mrs. Ayo Obe and Mr. Dulue Mbachu for editing the Manuscript, Mr. Rotimi Johnson, Miss Anne Aimua and Mr. Bunmi Olusona for carrying out the field work. Our very special gratitude goes to the International Centre For Human  ... New Breed - Volume 4, Issues 16-17 - Page 14
1991 - Snippet view - More editions - On the commitment of the students, Mr. Bunmi Olusona, the president of the University of Ibadan Students' Union says "the students' body will fight on behalf of the lecturers not because of the personalities involved, but based on the principles ... Newswatch - Volume 13, Issues 14-26 - Page 25
1991 - Snippet view - More editions - The, students who attended the meeting are Chukwuma Innocent, University of Nigeria, Nsukka; Bunmi Olusona, UI; Opeyemi Bamidele, Nigerian Law School, Lagos; Okereke Chima, University of Jos; Naseer Kura Ja'afaru, Bayero University, ...

References

I remain Kwara  (APC) Chairman -  Rev. Bunmi Olusona, January 22, 2014
Kwara ACN Candidate to appeal ruling, October 12, 2011
APC hands over Party structures to Saraki in Kwara, December 16, 2013
Protests rock Kwara over Offa rerun, September 3, 2013
Abdul Mahmud: The June 12, 1993 struggles, A personal Account, June 12, 2013
Our political strength is right, April 3, 2014

Rev. Bunmi Olusona is not interim chairman of APC, January 22, 2014
Don't install Saraki as Kwara APC leader - Olusona,  December 18, 2013
Kwara PDP meets Belgore supporters, January 8, 2014
Fresh crisis hits Kwara APC, December 17, 2014
Don't install Saraki Kwara APC leader, December 18, 2013
I remain Kwara State APC Chairman-Olusona, January 22, 2014
Saraki is a burden than asset-Olusona, January 5, 2014
Outcome of Presidential poll as likely factor in guber poll, April 11, 2015
How PDP is strategising to retake Kwara, April 29, 2014
Kwara ACN appoints caretaker committee
Belgore and Kwara APC, January 10, 2014
Party chieftain fault Saraki, May 28, 2006
Kwara opposition in disarray, March 29, 2007
Five jostle for Kwara PDP chair, April 14, 2014
Battle for the soul of Kwara, March 12, 2014
Jonathan's mission to revive Kwara PDP, March 7, 2014
 Offa rerun greeted with protests, September 3, 2013
Kwara APC members storm Ilorin, September 3, 2013
Protests over Offa election rerun, September 9, 2013

https://theeagleonline.com.ng/house-committee-on-efcc-appoints-media-consultant/

1965 births
Living people
Amnesty International prisoners of conscience held by Nigeria
University of Ibadan alumni
Yoruba activists
Nigerian activists
Nigerian prisoners and detainees
People from Kwara State